News9Live is a digital-only English news service based in Noida, India. It was launched on October 2, 2021, and is a part of the TV9 Network, which is promoted by Associated Broadcasting Company Pvt Ltd (ABCL), a joint venture of My Home Group and Megha Engineering & Infrastructure Limited (MEIL).

News9 Live is distinguished by its presentation of analysis and policy discourse in what it terms as the News, Narrative and Debate format, in which a news development is showcased in a three-tiered arrangement, with the news segment setting context, the narrative section providing interpretive perspectives and the debate subdivision illustrating the multiple opinions that arrange themselves around the story in question.

See also 
TV9 Kannada

References 

Kannada-language television channels
24-hour television news channels in India
Television stations in Bangalore
Television channels and stations established in 2009
2009 establishments in Karnataka